Fuk Loi is one of the 17 constituencies in the Tsuen Wan District.

The constituency returns one district councillor to the Tsuen Wan District Council, with an election every four years. The seat has been currently held by Kot Siu-yuen of the Hong Kong Federation of Trade Unions.

Fuk Loi constituency is loosely based on most part of the Fuk Loi Estate in Tsuen Wan with estimated population of 13,916.

Councillors represented

1991–94

1994 to present

Election results

2010s

2000s

1990s

References

Tsuen Wan
Constituencies of Hong Kong
Constituencies of Tsuen Wan District Council
1991 establishments in Hong Kong
Constituencies established in 1991